The white-tailed olalla rat (Olallamys albicauda) is a species of rodent in the family Echimyidae. It is endemic to Colombia where its natural habitat is subtropical or tropical moist lowland forests.

It is a medium-sized rat with a reddish-brown dorsum, a whitish venter, and a tail characterized by a whitish tip.

References

Olallamys
Mammals of Colombia
Endemic fauna of Colombia
Mammals described in 1879
Taxa named by Albert Günther
Taxonomy articles created by Polbot